Tetratheca ciliata, commonly known as pink bells, is a small shrub in the family Elaeocarpaceae. It is endemic to southern Australia.

It is a small shrub which may grow up to 100 cm high. Deep lilac pink flowers appear between October and November in the species' native range.

The species was first formally described by English botanist John Lindley in 1838 in Three Expeditions into the interior of Eastern Australia.

It occurs in Western Australia, South Australia, Tasmania, Victoria and New South Wales.

References

ciliata
Oxalidales of Australia
Flora of New South Wales
Flora of South Australia
Flora of Tasmania
Flora of Victoria (Australia)
Flora of Western Australia